The Bosonids were a dynasty of Carolingian era dukes, counts, bishops and knights descended from Boso the Elder. Eventually they married into the Carolingian dynasty and produced kings and an emperor of the Frankish Empire.

The first great scion of the dynasty was Boso V, Count of Arles and of other Burgundian counties in the mid-9th century. Boso rose in favour as a courtier of Charles the Bald. He was even appointed viceroy in Italy in 875. After the death of Charles' son Louis II, Boso refused to recognise both Louis' sons, Carloman and Louis III as kings of France and proclaimed himself King of Provence in 879 at Vienne, with the support of the nobility. Boso strove throughout the rest of his life to maintain his title in the face of the Emperor Charles III. He died in 887 and was succeeded by his son Louis under the regency of his wife Ermengard, a daughter of the Emperor Louis II.

Louis was adopted by Charles III and legitimised in his royal title. With this legal basis, he sought to take the place of his Carolingian relatives on the imperial and Italian thrones in 900. He was crowned in Pavia and then in Rome, but could not actually hold on to power there.

Bosonids
Boso the Elder
daughter, possibly named Richildis, married to Bivin of Gorze; for offspring see his branch
Boso, count in Italy
Teutberga, married to Lothar II king of Lotharingia
Hucbert, lay abbot of St-Maurice-in-Valais
Theobald of Arles, married to Bertha, daughter of Lothar II and Waldrada
Hugh of Arles, king of Italy
Lothair, king of Italy
Hubert, Duke of Spoleto (illegitimate)
Hugh, Margrave of Tuscany
Bertha (Eudokia), married Romanos II Roman Emperor of Macedonian dynasty
Boso, Margrave of Tuscany
Bertha or Gersenda, married firstly Boso of Burgundy (of Bivin's branch of Bosonids, below), and secondly Raymond II of Rouergue
Willa, married Berengar II of Italy
Rotbold/Rotbald (+950)
Boso II of Provence, married Constantia, daughter of Carolus Constantinus
Rotbold I, Count of Provence
Rotbold II, Count of Provence
William III of Provence
William I, Count of Provence
Constance of Arles, married Robert II of France
William II of Provence
William IV of Provence
Fulk Bertrand of Provence
William Bertrand of Provence
Geoffrey II of Provence
Geoffrey I of Provence
Bertrand II of Provence
Gerberga, Countess of Provence
Douce I, Countess of Provence

Bivinids
Richard, count of Amiens
Richard
Bivin of Gorze, married to a daughter of Boso the Elder, possibly named Richildis
Richard the Justiciar, Duke of Burgundy, first married to Adelaida of Auxerre
Rudolf, Duke Burgundy, King of France, married Emma of Paris
Louis
Judith
Hugh the Black, Duke of Burgundy
daughter or sister of Hugh the Black? Married to Gilbert of Burgundy
Adelaida, surnamed Werra, married to Robert of Meaux
Liegardis, married Otto, Duke of Burgundy
Boso, count, married Bertha, daughter of Boso, Margrave of Tuscany (of Boso the Elder's branch of Bosonids)
Gibuin, count of Dijon; from a second marriage
Hugo, count of Dijon
Richard, count of Dijon
Hugo, count
Gibuin, bishop of Chalon
Odo
Richildis, married to Charles the Bald
? possibly Bivin, count of Metz?
Boso, count of Vienne, king of the Provence, married secondly to Ermengard, daughter of Louis II
Louis the Blind; married Anna, daughter of Leo VI Roman Emperor of Macedonian dynasty
Carolus Constantinus, count of Vienne, married Theoberga of Sens
Hugobert
Richard
(perhaps) Constantia, married Boso II of Provence, son of Rotbold (+950)
Engelberga, married to William the Pious, duke of Aquitaine

Further reading
Constance B. Bouchard, "The Bosonids or Rising to Power in the Late Carolingian Age" French Historical Studies 15.3 (Spring 1988), pp. 407–431.

Sources
Pierre Riché, The Carolingians, a family who forged Europe.

 
Carolingian dynasty
Frankish noble families